"Gone" is a 1957 single by Ferlin Husky written by Smokey Rogers.  The song was Ferlin Husky's second No. 1 on the country chart, where it stayed at the top for ten weeks with a total of 27 weeks on the charts.  The vocal backing on the song was provided by the Jordanaires with soprano Millie Kirkham.  "Gone" also crossed over to the Hot 100 peaking at No. 4.  Selling over one million copies, 'Gone" was awarded a gold disc.

Recorded in Nashville at Bradley's Quonset Hut Studio, the recording is widely regarded as the first example of the Nashville Sound production approach. The use of echo and sparse instrumental support combined with the talented background singers heightened the drama of Husky's distinctive vocal.

Prior to recording this hit, Husky appeared regularly at the Grand Ole Opry. "Gone" propelled him to network television appearances first on Arthur Godfrey's Talent Scouts then a spot as guest host on the Kraft Television Theater, The Ed Sullivan Show, and eventually talk shows hosted by Steve Allen, Johnny Carson, and Merv Griffin. Husky had to give up his Opry slot, but TV exposure introduced him to millions of viewers.

Husky had previously recorded "Gone" for an earlier release on Capitol as Terry Preston.

Cover versions
In 1972, Joey Heatherton peaked at #24 on the US Hot 100 and #25 in Canada with her version of the song. It also peaked at number 38 in Australia.
In 1980, Ronnie McDowell hit the Top 40 on the country charts with his version of the song.
The Fleetwoods released a cover version of the song which can be found on their 1993 greatest hits album, Come Softly to Me: The Very Best of the Fleetwoods.

References

1952 songs
1957 singles
1972 singles
Ferlin Husky songs
Ronnie McDowell songs
The Fleetwoods songs
Capitol Records singles
MGM Records singles
Billboard Hot Country Songs number-one singles of the year